The Korail Class 371000 trains are commuter electric multiple units in South Korea used on the Gyeonggang Line.

Technical details

Electrical parts 
All trains use IGBT controls and use passive cooling with a heat pipe. The trains are also equipped with regenerative braking, reducing energy consumption and simplifying train inspection, and they use electric door motors.

All trains use LED headlights. There is a third headlight in the same compartment that houses the train run number and destination sign.

Interior design

Cabin 
The Class 371000 trains share the same cabin design with the 2016 batch of the 3rd generation Class 311000 trains (trains 311-95~311-99). Stop notifiers are installed, as are TGIS color displays. Dead section notifiers are also installed.

Formation 
The Class 371000 trains are organized in the following formation:
TC-M'-M'-TC

The symbols are defined below.
 M' car: Pantograph, main transformer, controller, motor
 TC car: Secondary power device, air compressor, battery, cabin

The cars of each train are numbered to correspond to the type of car each car is:
3710XX - Tc (SIV, air compressor, battery)
3711XX - M' (pantograph, transformer, inverter)
3712XX - M' (pantograph, transformer, inverter)
3719XX - Tc (SIV, air compressor, battery)

Depot 
The Class 371000 trains are stored at the Bubal train depot.

Trains 
The Class 371000 trains are numbered 371-01~371-12. Delivery of the trains began on February 19, 2016, and continued until August 19, 2016.

See also 
 Korail
 Gyeonggang Line

References

Electric multiple units of South Korea
Gyeonggang Line
Hyundai Rotem multiple units
25 kV AC multiple units